Schizoouridae is an extinct family of euornithean theropods that lived in what is now China during the Early Cretaceous. It was named in 2019 by Wang and colleagues, and contains all taxa more closely related to Mengciusornis dentatus and Schizooura lii than to Bellulornis or Jianchangornis microdonta. Members of the family possessed several features that are rarely found in euornitheans, but are more typical of enantiornitheans and more basal groups. These include a robust furcula with a prominent hypocleidium, and (in Mengciusornis) teeth at the tip of the premaxilla.

Classification 
The cladogram below follows Wang et al. (2019):

References 

Prehistoric euornitheans
Prehistoric dinosaur families
Early Cretaceous dinosaurs of Asia
Jiufotang fauna
Taxa named by Zhou Zhonghe